The Central American snapping turtle (Chelydra rossignonii), also known commonly as the Mexican snapping turtle and the Yucatan snapping turtle, is a species of turtle in the family Chelydridae. The species is endemic to Central America and Mexico.

Taxonomy
This species, Chelydra rossignonii, was previously considered a subspecies of Chelydra serpentina. It became a full species after scientists noticed some genetic differences and differences in the morphology of the two species' skulls.

Etymology
The specific name, rossignonii, is in honor of French-born coffee grower Jules Rossignon.

Subspecies
There are no recognized subspecies of C. rossignonii.

Description
C. rossignonii has a big head, lengthy tail, pointed snout, and a coarse carapace with three easily seen ridges. Its carapace comes in different colors, such as brown to olive or olive to black, while its small plastron can be either cream to yellow or tan to gray. This turtle's shell sometimes also has algae growing on it, which helps it to camouflage. The skin is either gray or black all over on adults, while juveniles have white speckles on their skin; the skin is also covered in long tubercles near the turtle's neck area.

Distribution and habitat
C. rossignonii is found in Belize, Guatemala, Honduras, and Mexico. The natural habitats of C. rossignonii are slow-moving freshwater rivers, swamps, tributaries, and wetlands. It prefers murky water with large amounts of vegetation, and stays away from open water.

Ecology and behavior
C. rossignonii is oviparous. It is also solitary and nocturnal.  The species is believed to be mostly aquatic, rarely going on land or basking in open spaces.

Diet
The Central American snapping turtle hunts by luring its prey with four to six barbels around the mouth. It is believed to be an omnivore that forages for an assortment of prey, including crabs, frogs, fish, shrimp, and plant material.

Conservation
In the last 30 years, C. rossignonii experienced a 30% population decline. It is threatened by habitat loss and overharvesting for food. Although it is protected by the law in Mexico and Guatemala, these laws are not enforced evenly and this turtle is still being exploited. A captive breeding program has been established in order to help the species gain population.

References

Bibliography

Further reading
Bocourt MF (1868). "Description de quelques chéloniens nouveaux appartenant a la faune Mexicaine ". Annales des Sciences Naturelles, Zoologie et Paléontologie, Paris, Cinquième Série [5th Series] 10: 121-122. (Emysaurus rossignonii, new species, pp. 121-122). (in French).

Chelydra
Turtles of North America
Reptiles of Central America
Reptiles of Belize
Reptiles of Guatemala
Reptiles of Honduras
Reptiles of Mexico
Reptiles described in 1868